Manmohan Tiwari (born 20 January 1984) is an Indian television and film actor and host.

He debuted with the show Jamunia but gained recognition from the television show Mann Kee Awaaz Pratigya (2011-12) and Hum Hain Na (2014). Apart from this Manmohan has acted in multiple television series, including Arakshan (2011), Honge Juda Na Hum (2013), Anamika (2013), Pavitra Bandhan (2013), Police Factory (2015), and Jana Na Dil Se Door (2016).

Manmohan was also one of the four finalists in the first of its kind reality show Rakhi Ka Swayamwar. He has hosted travel series like Namah Shivay on Anandam and 7th & 8th Aadhi Abadi Award Show.

He made his debut in Bollywood with the film Awesome Mausam and has worked in five Bhojpuri films. As of 2019, he is seen as Rohit in Balaji Telefilms's hugely popular fiction drama Kumkum Bhagya on ZEE TV.

Personal life and family
Manmohan Tiwari was born on 20 January 1984 in Rishikesh. He did his schooling from Saraswati Shishu Mandir. He completed his graduation from PG College Rishikesh. He further completed his LLB from Gadwal University. He got married in 2015 to an IT Professional Sneha Tiwari.

Filmography

Films

Television

Fiction shows

Non-fiction and reality shows

References 

1984 births
Indian male television actors
Indian male film actors
Living people
Male actors in Hindi cinema
Indian male models
Bhojpuri-language television
Male actors from Uttarakhand
People from Rishikesh
Hindi film editors
Film editors from Uttarakhand